Yoel Colomé Valencia (born 15 October 1982) is a Cuban football defender.

Club career
Colomé played as a rightback for hometown clubs Ciudad La Habana and La Habana. He played the 2016/17 season at Parham in Antigua and Barbuda alongside compatriots Odelin Molina and Hensy Muñoz and brother Jaime Colomé.

International career
He made his international debut for Cuba in a March 2007 friendly match against Venezuela and has earned a total of 42 caps, scoring 3 goals. He represented his country in 10 FIFA World Cup qualifying matches

He appeared in three matches with the Cuba national football team for the 2011 CONCACAF Gold Cup.

International goals
Scores and results list Cuba's goal tally first.

Personal life
His brother Jaime also played for the national team.

References

External links
 

1982 births
Living people
Sportspeople from Havana
Association football fullbacks
Cuban footballers
Cuba international footballers
FC Ciudad de La Habana players
Parham F.C. players
2011 CONCACAF Gold Cup players
2013 CONCACAF Gold Cup players
Cuban expatriate footballers
Expatriate footballers in Antigua and Barbuda
Cuban expatriate sportspeople in Antigua and Barbuda
Antigua and Barbuda Premier Division players